USS League Island (YFB-20) was a 166-foot-long commercial craft acquired by the U.S. Navy during World War II. It was primarily used as a ferryboat on the Delaware River, transporting military personnel between the Philadelphia Navy Yard, located on League Island, and military activities and contractors on the New Jersey side of the river.

Built in Philadelphia
Block Island (ex-Hook Mountain, ex-Machigonne) was built in April 1907 by Neafie & Levy S. and E. B. Co., Philadelphia, Pennsylvania; purchased by the Navy 24 February 1941 from H. Reynolds Palmer and Raymond H. Abell, Gales Ferry, Connecticut; classified YFB-20 27 February 1941; renamed League Island and placed in service 7 March 1941.

World War II service
League Island (YFB-20) was assigned to the 4th Naval District 17 March 1941 for ferrying service between the Philadelphia Naval Yard, and National Park, New Jersey, which she carried out efficiently throughout the war.

Post-war decommissioning
League Island was placed out of service 6 June 1946 and returned to the War Shipping Administration (WSA) 9 January 1947.

References
 

World War II auxiliary ships of the United States
Transports of the United States Navy
Ferries of Pennsylvania
Ferries of New Jersey
1907 ships
Ships built by Neafie and Levy